Martin Wohl (13 July 1930 – 21 July 2009), was a transportation economist. He was born in Greensboro, North Carolina and grew up in the District of Columbia.

During his youth, Wohl worked as a Senate page and was then appointed to the U.S. Military Academy in West Point, New York from North Carolina's 6th congressional district by Democratic congressman Carl T. Durham. He transferred to the Massachusetts Institute of Technology and served as a first lieutenant in the Army Corps of Engineers after graduation. Wohl later received his M.S. degree in civil engineering from MIT in 1960 with a thesis entitled Applications of symbolic models and simulation in traffic engineering. He subsequently earned a doctor of engineering degree from the University of California at Berkeley in December 1966 with a thesis entitled Development of a rationale for transportation investment.

After completing his master's degree, he became an assistant professor at MIT for two years before moving to Washington D.C., where he worked in the Department of Commerce during the Kennedy administration. After his federal service terminated, Martin became the director of transportation studies at the Urban Institute. In 1972, he accepted a faculty position at Carnegie Mellon University. Wohl retired in 1990, co-authored five technical books, and wrote more than seventy peer-reviewed journal articles on transportation. He is most recognized for "The Urban Transportation Problem" (1965), the book he co-authored with John R. Meyer and John F. Kain.

Martin Wohl got married three times and divorced from all of his wives. He died in 2009 from throat cancer at his home, in Fairfax, Virginia. Wohl was survived by his son from his first marriage, Charles Wohl, and his two granddaughters. He was interred at Arlington National Cemetery on 26 October 2009.

References

External links
 Guide to the Martin Wohl papers, 1919-2000s Martin Wohl C0174

1930 births
2009 deaths
People from Greensboro, North Carolina
United States Military Academy alumni
Massachusetts Institute of Technology alumni
Military personnel from North Carolina
Military personnel from Washington, D.C.
United States Army officers
Economists from North Carolina
Economists from Washington, D.C.
20th-century American economists
Massachusetts Institute of Technology faculty
Kennedy administration personnel
UC Berkeley College of Engineering alumni
Carnegie Mellon University faculty
People from Fairfax, Virginia
Deaths from throat cancer
Deaths from cancer in Virginia
Burials at Arlington National Cemetery